Pack or packs may refer to:

Music 
 Packs (album), by Your Old Droog
 Packs, a Berner (rapper) album

Places 
 Pack, Styria, defunct Austrian municipality 
 Pack, Missouri, United States (US)
 Chefornak Airport, Alaska, US (by ICAO code)

Groups of animals or people 
 Pack (canine), the family structure of African wild dogs, jackals and wolves
 Pack hunter, any animal that predates cooperatively
 Cub scouts group, in scouting
 Peloton, in road bicycle racing

Containment, packaging, and shipping 
 Pack, a deck of playing cards
 Backpack
 Cigarette pack
 Pack animal or beast of burden, an individual or type of working animal used by humans as means of transporting materials

Other uses 
 Pack (surname)
 Pack (aircraft), P.A.C.K (Pneumatic Air Cycle Kit), a kit containing an air cycle machine that provides air conditioning as part of an aircraft's environmental control system
 Pack (compression), a UNIX utility to compress files using Huffman encoding

See also 
 
 
 Packer (disambiguation)
 Packing (disambiguation)
 Pak (disambiguation)
 Pax (disambiguation)
 The Pack (disambiguation)
 The pack:
The scrum formed by forwards in rugby league
 The scrum formed by forwards in rugby union